Triangle is a census-designated place (CDP) in Prince William County, Virginia, United States. The population was 8,188 at the 2010 census. It is bounded to the south by the Marine Corps Base Quantico, which surrounds the town of Quantico.

Geography
According to the United States Census Bureau, the CDP has a total area of 2.6 square miles (6.8 km2), all of it land. It is bounded to the north and west by the town of Dumfries.  It is bounded to the west by Prince William Forest Park and to the east by the Potomac River.

Demographics
As of the census of 2000, there were 5,500 people, 2,196 households, and 1,341 families living in the CDP. The racial makeup of the CDP was 61.07% White, 28.33% African American, 0.49% Native American, 2.87% Asian, 0.11% Pacific Islander, 3.58% from other races, and 3.55% from two or more races. Hispanic or Latino of any race were 7.42% of the population.

There were 2,196 households, out of which 33.9% had children under the age of 18 living with them, 40.4% were married couples living together, 15.3% had a female householder with no husband present, and 38.9% were non-families. 29.7% of all households were made up of individuals, and 3.6% had someone living alone who was 65 years of age or older. The average household size was 2.50 and the average family size was 3.13.

In the CDP, the population was spread out, with 27.8% under the age of 18, 13.2% from 18 to 24, 34.4% from 25 to 44, 18.4% from 45 to 64, and 6.2% who were 65 years of age or older. The median age was 30 years. For every 100 females, there were 102.2 males. For every 100 females age 18 and over, there were 101.1 males.

The median income for a household in the CDP was $38,844, and the median income for a family was $43,811. Males had a median income of $32,017 versus $27,722 for females. The per capita income for the CDP was $18,982. About 7.1% of families and 8.8% of the population were below the poverty line, including 11.4% of those under age 18 and 4.9% of those age 65 or over.

In the 1950 United States Census, Triangle was combined with Dumfries, Virginia to form Dumfries-Triangle.  However, the two communities were separated again by the time of the 1960 census.

Government

References

External links

 Prince William County Government
 Dumfries Magisterial District Supervisor
 The National Museum of the Marine Corps

Census-designated places in Virginia
Census-designated places in Prince William County, Virginia
Washington metropolitan area